Claire Bidwell Smith (born May 21, 1978) is an American therapist and author
who specializes in grief. She is known for her memoir, The Rules of Inheritance, as well as her books After This: When Life is Over, Where Do We Go?  and Anxiety: The Missing Stage of Grief. Smith draws on the personal loss of both of her parents and on her profession as a grief counselor to help others navigate grief and healing.

Early life and education 
Claire Bidwell Smith's parents were diagnosed with cancer within months of each other when she was fourteen. Her mother died when she was eighteen and her father when she was twenty-five. Smith speaks often about how the experiences of their illnesses and subsequent deaths inform the work she does today. She is a graduate of The New School in New York, NY and received a master's in clinical psychology from Antioch University in Los Angeles, CA.

Writing 
Smith's first book, The Rules of Inheritance (Penguin, 2012), is a memoir about losing both of her parents to cancer as a young adult. It was published 2012 and has since been published in 19 countries. It was chosen as a Barnes & Noble Discover Pick in 2012 and nominated for a Books for a Better Life award in 2013.The Rules of Inheritance is currently being adapted for film.

Her second book, After This: When Life is Over, Where to We Go? (Penguin, 2015), explores the afterlife. In this book, Smith draws on her personal loss and her background as a bereavement counselor. She was featured in the Los Angeles Times discussing her work in After This in 2015.

Smith's most recent book is Anxiety: The Missing Stage of Grief (Hachette Books, 2018) explores the connection between grief and anxiety and offers strategies for healing after the loss of a loved one. Her work in this book received attention from The New York Times.

Notable work 
Claire has written for and been featured in many publications including The New York Times, The Atlantic, The Washington Post, Scientific American, The Los Angeles Times, MSNBC, The Chicago Tribune, Goop, Oprah Magazine, and Psychology Today. She has been featured as an expert guest on MSNBC to discuss grief and the COVID-19 pandemic.

References

External links 
 Official website

American memoirists
Living people
American women non-fiction writers
1978 births
21st-century American women